The Piaggio P.50 was an Italian prototype heavy bomber designed and built by Piaggio for the Regia Aeronautica (Italian Royal Air Force).

Design and development
The P.50 was the first design by Giovanni Casiraghi—following an outline for the project laid out by Piaggio designer Ing Giovanni Pegna—for the Piaggio company.

P.50-I
The first model, the P.50-I, was a four-engine shoulder-wing monoplane with a single large tailfin and rudder. It was powered by four 544-kilowatt (730-horsepower) Isotta-Fraschini Asso XI.RC V12 engines mounted in tandem pairs on the wings, with each engine driving one three-bladed propeller; two of the propellers were mounted in a pusher and two in a tractor configuration. For defense, the P.50-I had three machine gun positions, including a nose turret

Piaggio built two P.50-I prototypes, the first of which—MM369—flew in 1937. The second—MM370—was damaged in accident while landing at Malpensa airfield in 1938.

No production order for the P.50-I materialized.

P.50-II

A new model of the P.50, the P.50-II, appeared in 1938. It was re-engined with four 746-kilowatt (1,001-horsepower) Piaggio P.XI RC.40 radial engines, each driving a three-bladed propeller, dispensing with the tandem-engine, pusher-puller configuration of the P.50-I, instead mounting the engines separately with all four propellers as tractors. Its defensive armament was upgraded to five 12.7-millimeter (0.5-inch) machine guns.

Piaggio produced a single P.50-II prototype designated MM371. No production ordered resulted for the P.50-II, but Piaggio later applied the experience it gained from the design and construction of the three P.50 prototypes to the development of the Piaggio P.108 heavy bomber of World War II.

Variants
P-50-I
Four-engines in tandem push-pull nacelles - two built.
P-50-II
A single more powerful P.50 with four engines in separate tractor nacelles

Operators

Regia Aeronautica

Specifications (P.50-I)

Notes

References
 Donald, David. The Encyclopedia of World Aircraft. Leicester, UK: Blitz Editions, 1997. .
 Thompson, Jonathan W. Italian Civil and Military Aircraft 1930–1945, New York: Aero Publishers Inc., 1963. .

External links

AR Aircraft Manuals Blueprints Video Publications: Piaggio P.50

P.050
1930s Italian bomber aircraft
Four-engined tractor aircraft
Shoulder-wing aircraft
Aircraft first flown in 1937
Four-engined piston aircraft